Muhammad Nagar, is a town and union council of Depalpur Tehsil in the Okara District of Punjab Province, Pakistan.

Muhammad Nagar is located at 30°34'36N 73°58'37E.

References 

Union councils of Okara District